Elwyn Riley Shaw (October 19, 1888 – July 18, 1950) was an Illinois lawyer and judge who served as a justice of the Illinois Supreme Court (1933–1942), United States district judge of the United States District Court for the Northern District of Illinois (1944–1950) and briefly as a member of National Railway Labor Panel in 1943.

Early life and education

Born in Lyndon, Whiteside County, Illinois, Shaw received education locally in the public schools, then traveled to Ann Arbor, Michigan, where he received a Bachelor of Laws from the University of Michigan Law School in 1910, and immediately entered private practice in Illinois.

Illinois lawyer and judge

After returning to Illinois and being admitted to the bar, Shaw would begin a private legal practice in the Rock River valley area in western Illinois based in Freeport, Stephenson County, Illinois that continued for three decades. A lifelong Democrat, Shaw was an alternate at the Democratic National Convention in 1932.

Following President Franklin Delano Roosevelt's landslide victory during the Great Depression, Shaw won election as a justice of the Supreme Court of Illinois. He served for nearly a decade (1933 to 1942), including as Chief Justice from 1938 to 1939. He was a member of the National Railway Labor Panel in 1943.

Federal judicial service
On March 7, 1944, President Franklin D. Roosevelt nominated Saw to a seat on the United States District Court for the Northern District of Illinois vacated by the death of Judge Charles Edgar Woodward in 1942. The United States Senate confirmed on May 3, 1944, and Shaw received his commission on May 9, 1944. Shaw served in that capacity until his death on July 18, 1950.

References

Sources
 

|-

1888 births
1950 deaths
People from Whiteside County, Illinois
Chief Justices of the Illinois Supreme Court
Judges of the United States District Court for the Northern District of Illinois
United States district court judges appointed by Franklin D. Roosevelt
20th-century American judges
University of Michigan Law School alumni
Justices of the Illinois Supreme Court